Paddy Lane (7 January 1886 – 30 August 1937) was an Australian cricketer. He played three first-class matches for New South Wales between 1907/08 and 1912/13.

See also
 List of New South Wales representative cricketers

References

External links
 

1886 births
1937 deaths
Australian cricketers
New South Wales cricketers
Cricketers from Sydney